is a junction railway station in the city of Kitakami, Iwate, Japan, operated by the East Japan Railway Company (JR East), with a freight terminal operated by the Japan Freight Railway Company (JR Freight).

Lines
It is located 487.5 kilometers from the starting point of the Tōhoku Main Line at Tokyo Station and is also a terminus for the Kitakami Line.

Station layout

The local portion of Kitakami Station has an island platform and a single side platform. However, the side platform is cut, forming a partial bay platform, so that the platform effectively serves two tracks. The Tōhoku Shinkansen portion of the station has an island platform and a single side platform serving three tracks. All of the platforms are elevated. The station has a Midori no Madoguchi staffed ticket office.

Platforms

History
It was renamed Kitakami Station on 10 November 1954. The station was absorbed into the JR East network upon the privatization of the Japanese National Railways (JNR) on 1 April 1987. Services on the Tohoku Shinkansen commenced 30 March 1996.

Passenger statistics
In fiscal 2018, the station was used by an average of 3,778 passengers daily (boarding passengers only).

Surrounding area 
Kitakami City Hall
Hotel Mets Kitakami
Kitakami Post office
Hotel CityPlaza Kitakami

See also
 List of railway stations in Japan

References

External links

 

Railway stations in Iwate Prefecture
Tōhoku Shinkansen
Kitakami Line
Tōhoku Main Line
Railway stations in Japan opened in 1890
Kitakami, Iwate
Stations of East Japan Railway Company
Stations of Japan Freight Railway Company